Ypthima vuattouxi, or Vuattoux's ringlet, is a butterfly in the family Nymphalidae. It is found in Senegal, the Gambia, Ivory Coast, Ghana, Nigeria and Cameroon. The habitat consists of guinea savanna.

References

vauttouxi
Butterflies of Africa
Butterflies described in 1982